Karnawad is a town and a nagar panchayat in Dewas district in the Indian state of Madhya Pradesh.

Demographics

As of the 2011 Census of India, Karnawad had a population of 11,266. Males constitute 51% of the population and females 49%. Karnawad has an average literacy rate of 62.1%: male literacy is 72.65%, and female literacy is 51.4%. In Karnawad, 15% of the population is under 6 years of age.

Connectivity

Road
The NH47 i.e. the Indore - Nagpur Highway passes through Karnawad.

Rail
Kannod has no rail connectivity. The nearest important railway station is Indore Junction railway station.

Air
The nearest airport is Devi Ahilyabai Holkar Airport, Indore.

References

Cities and towns in Dewas district